Santana Esporte Clube, commonly referred to as Santana, is a Brazilian football club based in Santana, Amapá. The team competes in the Campeonato Amapaense, the top division in the Amapá state football league system. 

They won the Campeonato Amapaense seven times. The club's traditional rivals are Independente, and games between the two are known as the Clássico do Porto.

Santana is the fifth-best ranked team from Amapá in CBF's national club ranking, being placed 236th overall.

History
The club was founded on September 25, 1955. They won the Campeonato Amapaense in 1960, 1961, 1962, 1965, 1968, 1972, 1985.

Stadium
Santana Esporte Clube play their home games at Estádio Municipal de Santana. The stadium has a maximum capacity of 5,000 people.

Honours

State 

 Campeonato Amapaense
 Champions (7): 1960, 1961, 1962, 1965, 1968, 1972, 1985
 Runners-up (4): 1976, 2009, 2010, 2020

 Campeonato Amapaense Segunda Divisão
 Champions: 1957
Campeonato Amapaense U20
 Champions (2): 2021, 2022

Notes

References

Further reading

External links 

Football clubs in Amapá
Association football clubs established in 1955
1955 establishments in Brazil